Pusiola chota is a moth in the subfamily Arctiinae. It was described by Charles Swinhoe in 1885. It is found in the Democratic Republic of the Congo, Kenya and India.

References

Moths described in 1885
Lithosiini
Moths of Africa
Moths of Asia